Chauncey E. Heath was a member of the Wisconsin State Assembly.

Biography
Heath was born on July 17, 1881 in Arcadia, Wisconsin. His parents were Perry Sylvester Heath and Sarah Jane (Briggs) Heath. Heath worked as a mail carrier from 1906 to 1932 and as a farmer from 1932 to 1940. Additionally, he served in the Wisconsin National Guard from 1920 to 1926.

In 1902, Heath married Ethel Penny, who died in 1920. He would later marry Selma V. Wagner and, after her death in 1941, he married Alice Bernice (Engum) Pederson in 1943. Heath died in Osseo, Wisconsin in 1965 and was buried in Arcadia.

Electoral career
Heath was elected Sheriff of Trempealeau County, Wisconsin in 1940 and 1942. Later, he was a member of the Assembly during the 1945 session. His bid for re-election in 1946 was unsuccessful after he was defeated in the Republican primary.

References

External links
Find a Grave

People from Arcadia, Wisconsin
Republican Party members of the Wisconsin State Assembly
Wisconsin sheriffs
Military personnel from Wisconsin
Wisconsin National Guard personnel
Mail carriers
Farmers from Wisconsin
1881 births
1965 deaths
Burials in Wisconsin
People from Osseo, Wisconsin
20th-century American politicians